microBTX (also called uBTX) is a computer motherboard form factor.

See also
Comparison of computer form factors

References

Motherboard form factors